Annesley railway station was a station in Annesley, Nottinghamshire. It was opened in 1874, to serve the mining village of Annesley which had grown following the opening of Annesley colliery in 1865. It was closed in 1953 as part of the post-war cutback,  and the line closed to passengers in 1964. The station did not reopen as part of the Robin Hood Line project in the 1990s.

History

Opened by the Midland Railway, it became part of the London, Midland and Scottish Railway during the Grouping of 1923. The station then passed on to the London Midland Region of British Railways on nationalisation in 1948, closing five years later under the control of the British Railways Board.

Stationmasters
R. Grice 1874 - 1878
Henry Harding 1878 - 1888 
Henry Robinson 1889 - 1919
W.C. Stephenson  1935 - 1942 (formerly station master at Asfordby, afterwards station master at Codnor Park and Ironville)
F.J. Toghill 1942
B.V.Wall 1953 (Subsequently Swanwick Junction Station, then 1959 Station Master, Salima, Nyasaland (now Malawi) and then 1964 Victorian Railways, Melbourne, Australia)

The site today

Trains operating on the Robin Hood Line still pass the site. Although the line re-opened in stages during the 1990s Annesley station did not reopen due to its proximity to Newstead.

References

 
 
 Station on navigable O.S. map

Disused railway stations in Nottinghamshire
Former Midland Railway stations
Railway stations in Great Britain opened in 1874
Railway stations in Great Britain closed in 1953